Hussars were first recorded in Russia as groups of irregulars in the mid-17th century. Under Peter I, this class of light cavalry began to serve as organized regiments on a semi-permanent basis in 1723 based on Serbian Hussars out of the Habsburg monarchy. Hussar regiments remained a conscious element of the Imperial Russian Army until the Revolution of 1917.

Before Peter I 
Russian hussars were referred to as a "New (foreign) system" in 1634. By 1654, they were grouped in a regiment under the command of Colonel Christopher Rila. In the spring of 1654 Rila and his hussars are recorded in Moscow records, but after a year the documents were lost. This new class of light horse probably did not establish themselves as an effective force and were accordingly absorbed into the "Reiter" system.

In September 1660, the hussar companies that had been organized in Novgorod by Prince Ivan Khovanskii were discharged. These short-lived units had proved themselves in the battles of the Polish-Russian war. In August 1661 they were reorganized as a mounted body equipped in the Polish style with shoulder mounted "wings", lances and armor.

Peter the Great 
Three units of hussars are recorded as having participated in the 1694 Kozhuhovskaya campaign. The last mention of these irregulars is recorded in 1701, when they were transferred to newly raised Novgorod Dragoon Regiment of regular cavalry.

In 1707, Apostol Kigetsch, a Wallachian nobleman-serving Emperor Peter the Great, was commanded to form a khorugv ("banner" or "squadron") of 300 men to serve on the Ottoman-Russian border. The squadron consisted of Christians from Hungary, Serbia, Moldova and Wallachia. In 1711, prior to the Pruth campaign, 6 regiments (4 khorugv's each) of hussars were subsequently formed, mainly from Wallachia. Two other 'khorugv', for guerilla warfare, were formed, one Polish and one Serbian, to serve against the Ottomans.

With the completion of a regular army by Peter the Great, as well as the permanent establishment of regiments, the existing hussars and other irregulars (other than the Cossacks) were disbanded. In 1723 however, Tsar Peter authorized the formation of a hussar regiment, recruited exclusively from Serbian light cavalry  formerly serving in the Austrian army.

Peter's successors
During the regency of Grand Duchess Anna Leopoldovna, on 14 October 1741, four Hussar regiments, a Serbian (Serbskiy), a Moldavian (Moldavskiy), a Hungarian (Vengerskiy) and a Georgian (Gruzinskiy) were authorized.

After the Russo-Turkish War (1735–1739), these hussar regiments were converted to regular service. The rank and file were enlisted volunteers and not conscripts, as were the majority of the Russian army. The new hussar regiments had a status between regular and irregular cavalry. Hussars were recruited only from the nation indicated by the regiment's name, i.e., these regiments were national units in Russian service; all troops (including officers) were national, and commands were given in the respective languages. Each regiment was supposed to have a fixed organization of 10 companies, each of about 100 men, but these regiments were recruited from different sources, so they were often less than the indicated strength. Later, in 1759–60, three more Hussar regiments, were raised: the Yellow (Zeltiy), the Macedonian (Makedonskiy) and the Bulgarian (Bolgarskiy).

In 1754 two Serbians Rajko Preradović and Jovan Šević entered the Russian service. Accompanied by a significant number of Serbian families they received grants of land between Bakhmutov and Lugansk. In return they were tasked with forming two hussar regiments of 1000 men each.

Catherine the Great
Under Catherine II Rajko Preradović's and Jovan Šević's existing hussar units were merged into one – the Bahmutskiy Hussars- in 1764. Two years later, additional hussar units were formed with Cossack, Bulgarian and Macedonian recruits these were disbanded. After 1787 hussar regiments were again raised and by the war with France of 1812 twelve were in existence. By 1833 these had increased in number to fourteen line regiments plus two of the Guard (Grodno Hussars and  Elizavetgrad Hussars). After the reorganization of the cavalry dated 17 December 1812 all of the hussar regiments were reorganized into three divisions:

1st Hussar Division
 Grodno Hussars
 Elizavetgrad Hussars
 Izyum Hussars
 Sumy Hussars
    
2nd Hussar Division

 Alexandria Hussars
 Akhtyrka Hussars
 Irkutsk hussar regiment
 Mariupol Hussars

3rd Hussar Division

 Belarusian Hussars
 Lubny Hussars
 Olviopol Hussars
 Pavlograd Hussars

Alexander III and Nicholas II
In 1882 all regular Russian hussar and uhlan regiments (except the Imperial Guard), were converted to dragoons. All fourteen hussar regiments lost their traditional and distinctive uniforms as well as titles. The decision to abolish the traditions of the triumphant Russian army was very unpopular and widely opposed by military personnel. Many officers defiantly resigned, while others continued to wear makeshift versions of their former uniforms well into the mid-1880s. The new uniforms were designed in a simplified style, imitating the national semi-historical Russian costume, and were considered too simple and rustic. The reform left only two hussar regiments within the Imperial Guard (His Majesty's Hussar Life-Guards regiment and Grodno Life-Guards Hussar regiment) with their uniforms relatively unchanged.

In 1907, after the defeat in Russo-Japanese War (which to a degree was caused by the unpopular 1882 refom), the government of Nicholas II decided to restore the prestige of the Russian army. The previously re-converted hussar and uhlan regiments were restored in their historical titles. The new parade uniforms were generally based on those of pre-1882, though differed significantly in details.

In November 1917, the 20 existing hussar regiments, along the remainder of the former Imperial Army, were disbanded. A former officer of the 1st Sumsky Hussar regiment recorded that his regiment survived until February 1918 when, however, the remaining officers and the Soldiers' Committee decided "…to mount and ride away in different directions to their respective homes".

Hussar uniforms and equipment in the Russian Empire 

Late classical Russian hussar uniforms and equipment borrowed many elements of the Hungarian hussar form, and included:

 Dolman – short (up to the waist), single-breasted jacket with high collar and cords, which throws Mentik
 Kucsma – with the Sultan, cords (etishketami) and repeykom. Since 1803 Prior to that – Cap.
 Sash Gombe (interceptions)
 Pelisse – short jacket (with cords), fine fur, worn over the dolman
 Belt
 Breeches (Chakchiry)
 Sword
 Boots (boots) – Low
 Sarsala – piece for hussar horses
 Tashko – Bag
 Etishket – cord with tassels on shako
 A pair of pistols

All were richly adorned with gold or silver braid, cords, fringe and lace.

Gallery

References

Sources

Hussars